John Isner was the three-time defending champion, but lost in the final to Nick Kyrgios, 6–7(3–7), 6–7(4–7). Kyrgios was the first non-American winner in the tournament's history.

Seeds
The top four seeds receive a bye into the second round.

Draw

Finals

Top half

Bottom half

Qualifying

Seeds

Qualifiers

Lucky losers

Qualifying draw

First qualifier

Second qualifier

Third qualifier

Fourth qualifier

References
Main draw
Qualifying draw

Atlanta Open - Singles
BBandT Atlanta Open - Singles
2016 Singles
Atlanta